Osek may refer to:

Places
Czech Republic
Osek (Beroun District), a municipality and village in the Central Bohemian Region
Osek (Jičín District), a municipality and village in the Hradec Králové Region
Osek (Písek District), a municipality and village in the South Bohemian Region
Osek (Rokycany District), a municipality and village in the Plzeň Region
Osek (Strakonice District), a municipality and village in the South Bohemian Region
Osek (Teplice District), a town in the Ústí nad Labem Region
Osek nad Bečvou, a municipality and village in the Olomouc Region
Velký Osek, a municipality and village in the Central Bohemian Region

Poland
Osiek, Wejherowo County, also known as Òsek, a village in Poland

Slovenia
Osek, Nova Gorica, a village in Slovenia

Other
OSEK, automotive electronics standard